The FIL World Luge Championships 2004 took place February 13-15, 2004 at the Spiral track in Nagano, Japan. This marked the first time the event took place in Asia.

Men's singles

Women's singles

Men's doubles

Mixed team

Medal table

References
Men's doubles World Champions
Men's singles World Champions
Mixed teams World Champions
Women's singles World Champions

FIL World Luge Championships
International sports competitions hosted by Japan
2004 in Japanese sport
2004 in luge
Luge in Japan
Sports competitions in Nagano (city)